Taipei City Constituency III includes all of Zhongshan and most of Songshan in central Taipei. The district was created in 2008, when all local constituencies of the Legislative Yuan were reorganized to become single-member districts.

Current district
 Zhongshan
 Songshan: 3 sub-districts
 Dongshe: 9 urban villages
 Zhonghua, Minfu, Dongchang, Songji, Longtian, Minyou, Dongguang, Dongshi, Jingzhong
 Sanmin: 8 urban villages
 Sanmin, Dongrong, Xindong, Futai, Jieshou, Zhuangjing, Xinyi, Fujin
 Benzhen: 3 urban villages
 Ziqiang, Pengcheng, Anping

Legislators

Election results

2016

2012

2008

References 

Constituencies in Taipei